As a location, Rigsby may refer to:
Rigsby, Lincolnshire
Rigsby Surname
Rigsby Islands, in the Antarctic

As a surname, Rigsby may refer to:
Jim Rigsby (1923-1952), an American race car driver
Alex Rigsby (born 1992), an ice hockey goalkeeper
Rigsby sisters, former insurance claim adjusters involved in a 21st-century U.S. court case
House of Heroes, an American Christian band at one time including brothers Colin & Jared Rigsby

As a character name, Rigsby may refer to:
Wayne Rigsby, a character in  the 21st century police procedural The Mentalist
Rupert Rigsby, a character in the 1970s comedy Rising Damp

See also
Rigby (disambiguation)